CTEP (Ro4956371) is a research drug developed by Hoffmann-La Roche that acts as a selective allosteric antagonist of the metabotropic glutamate receptor subtype mGluR5, binding with nanomolar affinity and over 1000 times selectivity over all other receptor targets tested. In animal studies it was found to have a high oral bioavailability and a long duration of action, lasting 18 hours after a single dose, giving it considerably improved properties over older mGluR5 antagonists such as MPEP and fenobam.

References

Alkyne derivatives
Imidazoles
MGlu5 receptor antagonists
Pyridines
Trifluoromethyl ethers